Thorney was a rural district in England from 1894 to 1974, situated to the east of Peterborough.

It was created under the Local Government Act 1894, covering the parishes of Thorney and Stanground. It was considered part of the administrative county of the Isle of Ely. In 1904 Stanground was split, with the new parish Stanground North remaining in the district (and Isle of Ely), while  the remainder, Stanground South, became part of the Old Fletton Urban District in Huntingdonshire.

In 1965, when Isle of Ely was merged with Cambridge to form Cambridgeshire and the Isle of Ely, Thorney RD was instead transferred to the administrative county of Huntingdon and Peterborough.

In 1974, the district was abolished under the Local Government Act 1972, its area going to form part of the Peterborough district, in the new non-metropolitan county of Cambridgeshire.

References
https://web.archive.org/web/20071001021144/http://www.visionofbritain.org.uk/relationships.jsp?u_id=10108378

History of Peterborough
Politics of Peterborough
Districts of England abolished by the Local Government Act 1972
Districts of England created by the Local Government Act 1894
Rural districts of England